Michael Kapovich (also Misha Kapovich, Михаил Эрикович Капович, transcription Mikhail Erikovich Kapovich, born 1963) is a Russian-American mathematician.

Kapovich was awarded a doctorate in 1988 at the Sobolev Institute of Mathematics in Novosibirsk with thesis advisor Samuel Leibovich Krushkal and thesis "Плоские конформные структуры на 3-многообразиях" (Flat conformal structures on 3-manifolds, Russian lang. thesis). Kapovich is now a professor at University of California, Davis, where he has been since 2003.

His research deals with low-dimensional geometry and topology, Kleinian groups, hyperbolic geometry, geometric group theory, geometric representation theory in Lie groups, and configuration spaces of arrangements and mechanical linkages.

in 2006 in Madrid he was an Invited Speaker at the International Congress of Mathematicians with talk Generalized triangle inequalities and their applications.

He is married to mathematician Jennifer Schultens. He has two brothers, both of whom are mathematicians as well: Ilya Kapovich works in group theory and geometric topology at CUNY, and Vitali Kapovich researches global Riemannian geometry at the University of Toronto.

Selected publications

Articles 
 On monodromy of complex projective structures. Invent. Math. 119 (1995), no. 1, 243–265. 
 with B. Leeb: On asymptotic cones and quasi-isometric classes of fundamental groups of 3-manifolds. Geom. Funct. Anal. 5 (1995), no. 3, 582–603. 
 with J. J. Millson: On the moduli space of polygons in the Euclidean plane. J. Differential Geom. 42 (1995), no. 1, 133–164.
 with J. J. Millson: The symplectic geometry of polygons in Euclidean space. J. Differential Geom. 44 (1996), no. 3, 479–513. 
 with B. Leeb: Quasi-isometries preserve the geometric decomposition of Haken manifolds. Invent. Math. 128 (1997), no. 2, 393–416. 
 with J. J. Millson: On representation varieties of Artin groups, projective arrangements and the fundamental groups of smooth complex algebraic varieties. Inst. Hautes Études Sci. Publ. Math. 88 (1998), 5–95 (1999). 
 with D. Gallo, A. Marden: The monodromy groups of Schwarzian equations on closed Riemann surfaces. Ann. of Math. (2) 151 (2000), no. 2, 625–704.
 with B. Kleiner: Hyperbolic groups with low-dimensional boundary. Ann. Sci. Ecole Norm. Sup. (4) 33 (2000), no. 5, 647–669.
 with M. Bestvina, B. Kleiner: Van Kampen's embedding obstruction for discrete groups. Invent. Math. 150 (2002), no. 2, 219–235. 
 Homological dimension and critical exponent of Kleinian groups. Geom. Funct. Anal. 18 (2009), no. 6, 2017–2054. 
 Dirichlet fundamental domains and topology of projective varieties. Invent. Math. 194 (2013), no. 3, 631–672 
 with J. Kollár: Fundamental groups of links of isolated singularities. J. Amer. Math. Soc. 27 (2014), no. 4, 929–952. 
 with B. Leeb, J. Porti: Anosov subgroups: Dynamical and geometric characterizations. Eur. J. Math. 3 (2017), 808–898.

Books
  Reprint of the 2001 edition. Modern Birkhäuser Classics. Birkhäuser Boston, Inc., Boston, MA, 2009. 
 with B. Leeb, J. J. Millson: 
 with Cornelia Druţu:

References

External links

 lectures at Geometry, Groups and Dynamics (GGD) - 2017, International Centre for Theoretical Sciences, Tata Institute

20th-century Russian mathematicians
21st-century Russian mathematicians
20th-century American mathematicians
21st-century American mathematicians
University of California, Davis faculty
1963 births
Living people